Birkhead Branch is a stream in Lincoln County in the U.S. state of Missouri.

Birkhead Branch has the name of William Birkhead, an early settler.

See also
List of rivers of Missouri

References

Rivers of Lincoln County, Missouri
Rivers of Missouri